Anatoli Konstantinovich Isayev (14 July 1932 – 10 July 2016) was a Soviet football player and Soviet and Russian coach.

Honours
 Olympic champion: 1956.
 Soviet Top League winner: 1953, 1956, 1958, 1962.
 Soviet Cup winner: 1958.
 Honored Master of Sports of the USSR: 1957 
 Order "For Merit to the Fatherland", 4th class

International career
Isayev made his debut for USSR on 21 August 1955 in a friendly against West Germany. He played in the 1958 FIFA World Cup qualifiers but was not selected for the final tournament squad.

References

External links
  Profile 

1932 births
2016 deaths
Soviet footballers
Soviet Union international footballers
Soviet football managers
Russian footballers
Russian football managers
Soviet Top League players
FC Spartak Moscow players
FC Shinnik Yaroslavl players
Footballers at the 1956 Summer Olympics
Olympic footballers of the Soviet Union
Medalists at the 1956 Summer Olympics
Olympic medalists in football
Olympic gold medalists for the Soviet Union
FC Rotor Volgograd managers
Higher School of Coaches alumni
Recipients of the Order of Honour (Russia)
Honoured Coaches of Russia
Honoured Masters of Sport of the USSR
Burials at Vagankovo Cemetery
Association football forwards